Voronya may refer to one of the following:

Voronya, a river in the Kola Peninsula in Murmansk Oblast, Russia.
Voronya Cave, an alternative name for the Krubera Cave in Abkhazia, Western Caucasus